Quaid-i-Azam University Islamabad (commonly referred to as QAU), founded as University of Islamabad, is a ranked 1 public research university in Islamabad, Pakistan.

Founded as the University of Islamabad in 1967, it was initially dedicated to the study of postgraduate education but expanded and established as Qaid e Azam university in 1973 to an interdisciplinary university offering undergraduate and postgraduate education.

Overview 
The university has, as of 2015, grown into the largest varsity in Islamabad with a total enrollment exceeding 13,000 students. The university is on a 1700 acres (or 6.9 km2) campus on the foothills of the Margalla. Divided into four faculties and nine affiliated research institutes, QAU is among Pakistan's largest and highest ranked public universities. In 2020, it is ranked between 510 and 520 overall whilst in Physics, Mathematics and agriculture departments ranked 225th, 225th and 125th respectively worldwide, in emerging economics it's ranked below 100 which is probably a prestige, and also ranked 111th in Asia by the QS World University Rankings while its regional publications ranked QAU among 120 in Asia in 2013. The Times Higher Education World University Rankings ranked QAU between 401 and 500 globally and top 75 in Asia in its 2020 lists.

The university has intellectual interaction with international institutes, including the United Nations, University of Tokyo and the ICTP. It is one of the most popular universities in the country and counts several public figures and intellectuals among its current and former faculty, researchers, or alumni since its establishment. They include Maleeha Lodhi, Nasim Zehra, Shamshad Akhtar, Suhail Zubairy, Abdul Rashid Ghazi, Farzana Aslam, Tasneem Zehra and Salma Zahid. The university is currently led by Vice Chancellor Muhammad Ali.

History

The University of Islamabad was established on 22 July 1967 by the Government of Pakistan. It was renamed as Quaid-i-Azam University in honor of Quaid-e-Azam Muhammad Ali Jinnah, founder of Pakistan in 1976 - which was the year of his birth centenary. However, the spelling of the university's name were kept different i.e. "i" was used instead of "e" for Ezāfe that links the two words in Jinnah's title Quaid-e-Azam.

The university offered teaching and research programs for PhD and MPhil degrees in the beginning and later offered Masters programs. The university now offers undergraduate programs as well.

Quaid-i-Azam University has four different faculties and 38 departments, institutes, schools and centers.

Faculties and departments
Quaid-i-Azam University consists of four faculties. The following departments, institutes/schools work under these faculties:

Faculty of Natural Sciences 
 Department of Chemistry
 Department of Computer Science (Ranked 201st Worldwide)
 Department of Earth Sciences
 Department of Electronics
 Institute of Information Technology (Ranked 201st Worldwide)
 Department of Mathematics (Ranked 225th Worldwide)
 Department of Physics (Ranked 225th Worldwide)
 Department of Statistics

Faculty of Social Sciences 
 School of Law
 Quaid-i-Azam School of Management Sciences (QASMS)
 Department of Anthropology
 Department of Sociology
 Department of Linguistics
 Department of Defence & Strategic Studies
 School of Economics
 Department of History
 School of Politics and International Relations (SPIR)
 Taxila institute of Asian civilizations
 Department of Psychology
Department of Education

Faculty of Biological Sciences 
 National Center for Bioinformatics
 Department of Animal Sciences
 Department of Biochemistry
 Department of Microbiology
 Department of Plant Sciences (Ranked 125th Worldwide)
 Department of Environmental Sciences
 QAU School of Medicine
 Department of Pharmacy
 Department of Biotechnology

Faculty of Medical Science 
 Al-Shifa Eye Trust Hospital Rawalpindi
 Army Forces Post Graduate Medical Institute
 Health Services Academy, Islamabad
 Federal Medical & Dental College
 Quaid e Azam Postgraduate Medical College, PIMS

Institutes
 National Institute of Historical and Cultural Research (NIHCR) Center for Excellence
 Saulat Institute of Pharmaceutical Sciences and Drug Research
 Center of Excellence in Gender Studies
 National Institute of Psychology
 National Institute of Pakistan Studies
 Area Study Centre for Africa, North and South America
 Chairs
 Quaid-i-Azam Chair
 Benzair Bhutto Chair
 Rumi Chair

Central library 

The university has central library (CL), named as DR. Raziuddin Siddiqi memorial library situated at the centre of the university campus and having total covered area is approximately 102,500 sq. ft. On 6 February 1999, the Central Library (CL) was renamed the Dr. Raziuddin Siddiqi Mermorial (DRSM) Library in honour of Dr. Raziuddin Siddiqi's illustrious and meritorious achievements as the founding Vice Chancellor of Quaid-i-Azam University. University offers DRSM Library services for faculty and students of the university.

Rankings and reputation

Quaid-i-Azam University was ranked 363 in the world by the QS World University Rankings of 2022-2023 and 91st in Asia.

In the 2010 edition of QS's Asian University Rankings for Natural Sciences, QAU ranked 46th. According to the 2015 ranking of the Higher Education Commission of Pakistan, Quaid-i-Azam University is ranked third in the general category.

Notable alumni and faculty

 Abdul Rashid Ghazi
 Aasim Sajjad Akhtar
 Abrar ul Haq
 Mian Muhammad Aslam Iqbal
 Hamza Ali Abbasi
 Ahmed Hassan Dani
 Akbar S. Ahmed
 Alamgir Hashmi
 Ansar Pervaiz
 Arshad Sharif 
 Asghar Qadir
 Fayyazuddin
 Ismat Beg
 Irshad Hussain
 Hareem Farooq
 Ilhan Niaz
 Khadija Mushtaq
 Maliha Lodhi

 Marriyum Aurangzeb
 Mazhar Mahmood Qurashi
 Muhammad Sharif
 Muhammad Suhail Zubairy
 Muhammad Imran Qadir
 Nasim Zehra
 Nargis Sethi
 Nisar Ali Khan
 Pervaiz Iqbal Cheema
 Pervez Hoodbhoy
 Qaiser Mushtaq
 Qamar-uz-Zaman Chaudhry
 Rana Mubashir
 Zafarullah Khan
 Raziuddin Siddiqui
 Shamshad Akhtar
 Shireen Mazari
 Tahir Amin
 Tasneem M. Shah
 Zia Mian
 Anis Ahmed

References
 President Appoints Professor Dr. Niaz Ahmed Akhtar as Vice Chancellor of QAU (Shameel Khokhar News) 10 March 2023

External links
Official website

 
Universities and colleges in Islamabad
Public universities and colleges in Pakistan
1967 establishments in Pakistan
Educational institutions established in 1967
Islamabad Capital Territory
Memorials to Muhammad Ali Jinnah